Gurid-e Sar Bisheh (also Romanized as Gūrīd-e Sar Bīsheh and Gurīd-i-Sarbīsheh; also known as Goorid, Gūrīd, and Gūrīd Pā’īn) is a village in Momenabad Rural District, in the Central District of Sarbisheh County, South Khorasan Province, Iran. At the 2006 census, its population was 93, in 24 families.

References 

Populated places in Sarbisheh County